Walpurga (minor planet designation: 256 Walpurga) is a large Main belt asteroid. It was discovered by Johann Palisa on 3 April 1886 in Vienna and was named after Saint Walburga.

Photometric observations at the Oakley Observatory in Terre Haute, Indiana, during 2007 were used to build a light curve for this asteroid. The asteroid displayed a rotation period of 16.64 ± 0.02 hours and a brightness variation of 0.38 ± 0.02 in magnitude.

References

External links
 The Asteroid Orbital Elements Database
 Minor Planet Discovery Circumstances
 
 

Background asteroids
Walpurga
Walpurga
18860403